"The One Where Rachel Has a Baby" is the double-length finale of the eighth season of Friends. It first aired on NBC on May 16, 2002. In the episode, Rachel spends 21 hours in labor, and watches many of her roommates, including Janice giving birth before her. Monica and Chandler decided to have a baby, Judy wants Ross to propose to Rachel, Phoebe flirts with a patient at the hospital, and Rachel accidentally thinks Joey proposed to her.

Part 1 was written by Scott Silveri, and Part 2 was written by Marta Kauffman and David Crane. Both episodes were directed by Kevin S. Bright. The two part finale was the most watched episode of the season with 34.91 million viewers. Jennifer Aniston won an Emmy Award for her work in the episode.

Plot

Part I
Ross and Rachel frantically arrive at the hospital, where they are greeted by Chandler, Monica, Phoebe, and Joey. Even though they requested a private room, the only thing available is a semi-private one. Many couples come and go as Rachel waits hours to give birth. Judy comes into the room, asking to talk to Ross privately outside in the hallway. She gives Ross his grandmother's engagement ring and wants him to propose to Rachel with it. Ross isn't too sure about it but takes the ring anyway, putting it in his jacket. Meanwhile, in the waiting room, Monica jokes to Chandler about wanting to have a baby just to freak him out. He agrees that he has been thinking about having a baby too which in return freaks Monica out. The two of them decide to start a family and start trying for one right away while at the hospital. At the vending machine, Phoebe flirts with a patient named Cliff and goes looking for his room. Chandler and Monica try to find somewhere in the hospital to have sex in, and when they find an empty room they are interrupted by a nurse. Rachel watches impatiently as women who arrived at the hospital after her go into labor before her. Ross and Rachel are shocked when one of the women is Janice. Next door Chandler and Monica discover another empty private room. As they are getting it on, they stop when they hear Janice's laugh.

Part II
Chandler and Monica go next door to see if they actually heard Janice, and they are correct. With help from Joey, Phoebe finds Cliff's room but wants him to pose as "Dr. Drake Ramoray" to ask Cliff personal questions before she goes in. Finally, after 21 hours of labor, Rachel gives birth to her baby girl. Ross and Rachel share an intimate moment in the delivery room. When Phoebe gets to know Cliff better, Days of Our Lives is playing on the TV, and Cliff recognizes Joey. Phoebe tries to deny it, but Joey bursts into the room to tell her Rachel is having her baby. They end up telling him the truth. The rest of the gang comes by the room to see Rachel and the baby, and they ask what her name is. Ross introduces her as Isabella, which makes Rachel cry, and says, "that's not her name." He then says their backup name, Delilah, which leaves Rachel in disgust and says the name sounds like a biblical whore. Monica gladly gives Rachel the girl name she has picked out to use for herself, Emma, since Rachel liked it so much. Later on Rachel, who is now all alone in her room, gets a visit from Janice. Janice introduces her new baby, Aaron, which leaves Rachel aghast after looking at him. Janice tells her that Ross may not always be there for her and the baby, and he might even start a new family with another woman. She leaves Rachel saddened and afraid, especially when Ross walks in and tells her he got distracted talking to a nurse while on his way to get some sodas. He goes back to get some. Joey walks in and comforts her, telling her that he will always be there for them. Looking at Emma through the nursery window, Phoebe asks Ross why he and Rachel are not together. He tells her the reasons why, but she tells him he could finally have everything he's dreamed of since he was 15. Back in the room, Joey goes to get Rachel some tissues, and when he does, the ring falls from Ross' jacket. Joey kneels to pick it up, and Rachel, believing he is proposing, impulsively says yes. Meanwhile, Ross, with a bouquet in his hand, makes his way back to the room, intending to ask Rachel if she wants to start things up again.

Production
Kevin S. Bright directed the two part finale with Scott Silveri writing Part 1, and Marta Kauffman and David Crane writing Part 2.

Reception

Accolades
At the 54th Annual Primetime Emmy Awards, Jennifer Aniston won Outstanding Lead Actress in a Comedy Series for her work in the episode. At the 54th Primetime Creative Arts Emmy Awards, the episode was nominated for Outstanding Art Direction for a Single-Camera Series, and Outstanding Sound Mixing for a Comedy or Drama Series (Half-Hour) and Animation,.

References

2002 American television episodes
Friends (season 8) episodes